Leptonotis is a genus of small, limpet-like sea snails, marine gastropod mollusks in the family Hipponicidae, the hoof snails.

Species
Species within the genus Leptonotis include:

Leptonotis perplexus (Suter, 1907) 
Leptonotis wharekuriensis Laws, 1935

References

Hipponicidae